Meri Maa is a Pakistani drama television series that aired on Geo TV from 22 August 2013 to 17 March 2015. The series was directed by Wajahat Hussain Gilani, and written by Kishor Asmal and Raheel Ahmed. It was an A&B Entertainment drama. The series is based on social, tragic and emotional issues of the typical society.

Synopsis 
The drama theme revolves around the family of Mr. Sultan. The eldest son Yousaf and his wife Fatima and the younger Rehan and his wife Nimra. Mr. Sultan has deep desire for a daughter. Rehan and Nirma had two sons. Yousaf and Fatima had their second child as a daughter. It is the first girl in their family and became the center of love from every member of the family. For this Nirma got jealous that her sons are getting ignored on a girl. From here the story takes a turn of Mr. Sultan's family and the lives of the family members become shattered right after the birth of a girl.

Cast
 Anum Fayyaz as Rameen Yousaf/ Rameen Danial (Female Lead)
 Suzain Fatima as Fatima Yousaf
 Madiha Rizvi as Nimra
 Kamran Gilani as Yousuf Hashmi
 Hammad Farooqui as Danial
 Anum Aqeel as Seema
 Pari Hashmi as Sajal Adnan 
 Esha Noor as Erum
 Asad Siddiqui as Shan/Shani
 Imran Ashraf as Adnan
 Taqi Ahmed as Salman
 Ayaz Samoo as Shafqat
 Faizan Khawaja as Rehan
 Binita David as Rukhsana
 Hassan Ahmed as Naveed Shah
 Anwar Iqbal as Sultan
 Esha Butt
 Rashid Farooqui

References

External links 
 
 

2013 Pakistani television series debuts
A&B Entertainment
Geo TV original programming
Pakistani drama television series
Urdu-language television shows